Mariela de Jesús Viteri Velasco (born December 27, 1968) is an Ecuadorian television presenter, radio host, media director, and actress. She has hosted talk shows such as Simplemente Mariela, which ran for 12 seasons on Telecentro (now TC Televisión).

She is also a businesswoman, serving as the media director of Radio Fuego and the magazine Revista Mariela. In 2013, her company Producciones de Fuego launched the website MarielaTV.com and YouTube channel MarielaTV.

Early life
Mariela Viteri was born in Bahía de Caráquez on December 27, 1968, to parents Mariana Velasco and Dr. Leonardo Viteri. She has four siblings.

Career
Viteri began her television career in 1989 on the Telecentro program Aplausos. After this, she co-hosted Música y Deportes with Gerardo España on the channel CableDeportes, following a format of mischievous interviews with national and international personalities. She became the main face of the show after España's departure.

In 1993, Viteri moved to CRE Televisión (now Canal Uno), where she worked as an interviewer for the shows Na 'que ver and Media hora con Mariela.

In early 1994, she created the program Aquí Mariela on Teleamazonas, where she was given the opportunity to interview personalities from both Ecuador and Spain.

Viteri returned to Telecentro in 1997 to host La Hora de Mariela. This had low ratings, as it was a midday program opposite the popular El Show de Bernard. Due to its poor performance, Jorge Kronfle proposed a new weekly interview program, Simplemente Mariela. This was a great success, remaining on the air for 12 seasons, and frequently leading its time slot.

She has been a juror for several competition programs, such as Escuela de famosos in 2011, Soy el mejor VIP in 2014, and Prueba de amor in 2019.

Foray into acting
In 2018, Viteri acted in the Ecuavisa telenovela , in which she narrates the life of the titular singer. In the story, Viteri plays the character Luz María, host of the TV show Destellos, based on Luzmila Nicolalde, host of Chispazos. The same year, she made a special appearance on the fourth season of the comedy , also on Ecuavisa.

Radio Fuego and Revista Mariela
Viteri is a businesswoman, serving as the executive president of Radio Fuego: 106.5 FM, created in 1995 together with her then husband Ricardo Mórtola, and of Revista Mariela, launched in 2006 as a guide for women on the topics of nutrition, psychology, interviews, entertainment, and fashion.

Digital media
In 2013, her company Producciones de Fuego launched the web platform MarielaTV.com, as an outlet for both magazine and radio station. Her YouTube channel features content such as interviews with personalities from the entertainment medium under the title Miércoles de MarielaTV, as well as nutrition, health, beauty, and psychology interviews on Mariela en Cabina.

Media roles

TV programs
 Aplausos (1989, Telecentro) - presenter
 Música y Deportes (1990, CableDeportes) - presenter
 Media hora con Mariela (1993, CRE Televisión) - presenter
 Na que ver (1993, CRE Televisión) - presenter
 Aquí Mariela (1994, Teleamazonas) - presenter
 La Hora de Mariela (1997, TC Televisión) - presenter
 Simplemente Mariela (1998–2011, TC Televisión) - presenter
 Escuela de famosos (2011, Ecuavisa) - juror
 MarielaTV (2015) - presenter
 Soy el mejor VIP (2015, TC Televisión) - juror
 Prueba de amor (2019, Ecuavisa) - juror
 EnfiesTC (2020, TC Televisión) – guest presenter

Digital programs
 MarielaTV (2013–present, YouTube) - presenter

Radio programs
 MarielaTV (2013–present, Radio Fuego) - presenter

Telenovelas
  (2018, Ecuavisa – herself
 Sharon la Hechicera (2018, Ecuavisa)- Luz María

References

External links
 MarielaTV

1968 births
21st-century businesswomen
Ecuadorian businesspeople
Ecuadorian telenovela actresses
Ecuadorian television presenters
Ecuadorian women television presenters
Ecuadorian YouTubers
Living people
People from Manabí Province
21st-century Ecuadorian women